Mahfouz is a surname. Notable people with the name include:

Khalid bin Mahfouz (1949–2009), Saudi businessman
Naguib Mahfouz, Nobel Prize–winning Egyptian novelist
Naguib Pasha Mahfouz (1882–1974), Egyptian obstetrician and gynecologist
Sabir Mahfouz Lahmar, Algerian-born naturalised Bosnian citizen detained by the United States in Guantanamo Bay, Cuba from 2002 to 2009

See also 
 Mahfuz, a given name